Saint James of Gobiendes is a Roman Catholic pre-romanesque church, located in Gobiendes, next to Colunga, Asturias, Spain. It was built during the reign of Alfonso II of Asturias, its structure is typical   of pre-romanesque Asturian architecture. 

It underwent through an important remodeling in 1853, being further restored in 1946 and in 1983.

See also 
Asturian architecture
Catholic Church in Spain

Notes

References 
 

9th-century churches in Spain
Santiago de Gobiendes
Bien de Interés Cultural landmarks in Asturias